The 1997 Fiji rugby union tour of New Zealand was a series of matches played in May and June1997 in New Zealand by Fiji national rugby union team.

Results 
Scores and results list Fiji's points tally first.

References 

1997 rugby union tours
1997 in Oceanian rugby union
1997
1997 in Fijian rugby union
1997 in New Zealand rugby union
1997